The women's 64 kilograms competition at the 2018 World Weightlifting Championships was held on 4–5 November 2018.

Schedule

Medalists

Records

Results

 All competitive results obtained by Lin Tzu-chi from 24 June 2016 are disqualified after WADA won an appeal at the Court of Arbitration for Sport.

New records

References

External links
Results 
Results Group A 
Results Group B
Results Group C
Results Group D

Women's 64 kg
2018 in women's weightlifting